Spring Zouk is the name of an infamous festival in which was held February 3–5, 2012 at Udupi beach on at St Mary's Islands in India. The festival was a project coordinated by the state government and various sponsors to attract international tourism.

Description
The event was a 3-day music festival where 30 international bands performed.

Sponsors
The event was sponsored by Kingfisher, VH1, and the government of Karnataka.

Performers
Juno Reactor, Prem Joshua, Gipsy Shalon and others were among the performers at the event.

Reviews
Attendees at the event reported that it was successful and fun.

Porngate

It was accused that at the event some people had public sex. Actually, there was this just one incident, where a foreign couple had their clothes on. but were gyrating each other. Someone took a video clip of this and when they did air on TV, the bodies of the couple were blurred to leave it to peoples imagination. Then there was talk among some local people that the foreigners' way of having a party was not in accord with local customs. A government committee decided to review the events at the party and compare them with community values.

Shortly after the party, some members of the Karnataka Legislative Assembly watched a sexually explicit video taken from this event during government proceedings, and subsequently resigned amid public outcry of watching pornography. The media named the scandal about watching the video from this event as Porngate.

See also
List of electronic music festivals
Live electronic music

References

External links

Music festivals established in 2012
Music festivals in India
Electronic music festivals in India
2012 music festivals